Gholam Hossein Peyrovani (born March 29, 1955 in Shiraz, Iran) is a former Iranian football player and now manager.

He was the coach of the Iran national under-23 football team from 2009 to 2010. He is also the older brother of former Persepolis and Iranian national team player, Afshin Peyrovani.

Playing career

Club career
In 1969, at the age of 15, Peyrovani joined Shiraz's most popular team, Bargh Shiraz. His father was a big fan of the team as well, and helped the team financially. He quickly established a spot for himself in the team, and eventually became the starting libero. Peyrovani attracted the attention of many and in 1976 was named the best libero of the Takht Jamshid Cup by Donyaye Varzesh (World Of Sports) magazine. He played 25 years for Bargh Shiraz and retired at the age of 40 from competitive football.

International career
His international career was less spectacular though. He played in the Iranian national youth teams that won the AFC Youth Championship in 1973 and 1974. He was called up several times to the national team but never made the final squad. He also participated in some international tournaments with his club team, but none were of any significance.

Managerial career
Due to his love of Shiraz, he has spent most of his management career in his hometown. He coached Bargh Shiraz briefly on two occasions in 1995 and 1998. His most impressive work though has come with another Shirazi club, Fajr Sepasi. From 1999 to 2009, Despite a very low operating budget, he has been able to keep his teams competitive, almost always using young players. He has discovered several Iranian players such as Davoud Seyed Abbasi, Siavash Akbarpour and Mehdi Rahmati among others. His highest achievement to date with the club has been winning the Hazfi Cup in 2001 and finishing second in consecutive years, in 2002 and 2003.

On 5 January 2009, he was selected as the manager and head coach of Iranian Olympic team by Iranian football federation for 2012 Summer Olympics but he resigned after his side finished fourth in 2010 Asian Games. After his resignation as Olympic team head coach, he became head coach of Iran Pro League side, Sanat Naft. He resigned from his post just after four months. He was later head coach of Aboomoslem.

On 21 May 2013, he signed a three years contract with Fajr Sepasi, the club he managed from 1999 to 2009. His first match at the return to Fajr was a 1–0 loss to Naft Tehran. He resigned as manager of Fajr on 7 September 2013 after a bad start of the league.

Statistics

Honours

Player
Iran U-19
AFC Youth Championship:
Winner (1): 1973, 1974

Manager
Fajr Sepasi
Hazfi Cup:
Winner (1): 2000–01
Runner-up (2): 2001–02, 2002–03

References

External links

1955 births
Living people
Iranian footballers
Iranian football managers
People from Shiraz
Bargh Shiraz players
Association football midfielders
Sanat Naft Abadan F.C. managers
Sportspeople from Fars province
Bargh Shiraz F.C. managers